Mehr Chand Khanna (1 June 1897 – 20 July 1970) was an Indian politician who served as the Union Minister for Rehabilitation from 1954 to 1962 and Law Minister from 1954 to 1957.Mr Mohan Lal Saksena was the first Rehabilitation Minister of the Government of India (1948 to 50).

Early life and education 
Khanna was born in a Hindkowan Hindu family in Peshawar on 1 June 1897 to Karam Chand Khanna, a rich businessman.

He had his schooling in Peshawar and graduated from Edwardes College, Peshawar. Khanna also graduated in law and practised for a time as a lawyer.

Politics 
Mehr Chand Khanna entered politics at an early age and founded the Hindu Sabha. In 1926, he served as member of the Peshawar Cantonment Board, as a Hindu representative. He served for some time as a member of the Frontier Crimes Regulations Enquiry Committee set up by the Government of India.

In 1932, he was elected to the North West Frontier Province Assembly from the Peshawar Cantonment constituency as a member of the Hindu-Sikh Nationalist Party. When the Frontier National Congress captured power in the province in the 1937 elections and Khan Abdul Jabbar Khan became the Premier, Khanna, whose party was in winning alliance, was made the Minister of Finance. Khanna was the only Hindu minister in the cabinet. He was also the only cabinet minister who was not related to Khan Abdul Ghaffar Khan.

Khanna served as the Minister of Finance from 1937 to 1939, when Congress ministries all over India resigned in protest against Britain's declaration of war against Germany. He also served as Minister of Finance in the second Frontier Congress cabinet which ruled from 1945 to 1947.

Arrest 
Khanna was serving as a cabinet minister in the NWFP government when the dominion of Pakistan was formed on 14 August 1947. However, the government was dismissed soon afterwards.

In January 1948 Khanna was arrested along with Khan Abdul Ghaffar Khan on charges of possessing firearms and lodged in Peshawar jail. The Indian government sent Anglo-Indian lawyer Frank Anthony to secure his release as no Hindu lawyer was willing to travel to Pakistan. Upon his release Khanna migrated to India and settled down in Delhi.

In the Indian government 
Khanna participated in the Lok Sabha elections in independent India and was elected from the New Delhi Lok Sabha constituency. He served as Minister of Rehabilitation in the Jawaharlal Nehru cabinet from 1954 to 1962. Being a refugee himself, he is believed to have handled the refugee problem well. From 1954 to 1957, he also handled the law portfolio. During the 1960s, he was also giving the portfolio of housing.

Death 
Khanna died on 20 July 1970 in Delhi at the age of 73.

Notes

References 
 

1897 births
1970 deaths
India MPs 1962–1967
Law Ministers of India
People from Peshawar
Lok Sabha members from Delhi
Indian National Congress politicians
Punjabi people